John Warden (died 1628), of Widemarsh Street, Hereford, was an English politician and Member of Parliament.

Life
In  he inherited his father's estate, and took on the obligation to pay an annuity of £10 to his mother in lieu of a jointure. by  he claimed to have a net worth of £3,000.

He was Mayor of Hereford between 1604 and 1605. He was returned (elected) as MP for Hereford at a by-election in 1610 during the final session of the first Jacobean Parliament, and re-elected in 1614. On neither occasion did he participate as either as a committeeman or debater. He was named as an alderman in the 1619, and as an ex-officio magistrate in 1620. He served as a commissioner for the Forced Loan in 1626–27 as part of his civic office. He died shortly before June 1628. His widow survived him for by 20 years.

References

16th-century births
1628 deaths
Mayors of Hereford
English MPs 1604–1611
English MPs 1614